The Faithful River is a Polish historical film directed by Tadeusz Chmielewski. It was produced in 1983 and released in 1987.

References

External links
 

1987 films
Films based on works by Stefan Żeromski
Polish historical films
1980s Polish-language films
1980s historical films